A ploughing match is a contest between people who each plough part of a field.  Nowadays there are usually classes for horse-drawn ploughs and for tractor ploughing.  Points are awarded for straightness and neatness of the resulting furrows.

The annual 3-day long Irish National Ploughing Championships has grown into one of the largest outdoor events in the world, with commercial exhibits and a significant national media presence.

In Ontario, the International Plowing Match is an important rural event.

References

External links
 http://www.ploughmen.co.uk/
 http://www.cheshireploughing.co.uk/
 http://www.ploughingmatch.co.uk/
 http://www.southwellploughingmatch.co.uk/
 http://www.plowingmatch.org/
 World Ploughing Match 1963, 1963, Archives of Ontario YouTube channel

Agriculture